The Place d'Armes (or simply Plëss) is a square in Luxembourg City in the south of the Grand Duchy of Luxembourg. Centrally placed in the old town, it attracts large numbers of locals and visitors, especially in the summer months. It originally served as a parade ground for the troops defending the city.

History
After a huge fire in 1554 destroyed a large part of the Ville Haute, plans were made to lay out a square in the centre of the fortified town. The task was assigned to the Dutch military engineer Sebastian van Noyen who designed the first version of the square, then known as the Neumarkt, or New Market. In 1671, the Spanish engineer Jean Charles de Landas, Count of Louvigny, produced a slightly smaller square at the same location. It became known as the Place d'Armes as it was used as a parade ground for the garrison. Under Louis XIV, it was paved with flagstones and bordered with lime trees.

The Place d’Armes today

Now an integral part of the pedestrian zone, the square is surrounded by numerous cafés and restaurants, all with pavement terraces in the summer months. It has become the city's main centre of activity, attracting locals and visitors of all ages. Visiting bands and music groups present concerts from the central bandstand every summer evening. Every second and fourth Saturday, there is a flea market and in December the square houses the Christmas market.

Cercle Municipal
The Palais Municipal or Cercle as it is generally known stands at the eastern end of the square. It was originally designed as an administrative building with reception rooms. The main structure was completed in 1906 but work on the interior took until 1909.

On the facade, there is a sculpture by Luxembourg artist P. Federspiel of Countess Ermisinde granting the Charter of Emancipation in 1244 which guaranteed the citizens rights and duties towards the nobility.  

After a period when it was used for the European Court of Justice the Palais Municipal has, since 1969, served as a venue for celebrations and cultural events.

A plaque on the Cercle Municipal records the liberation of Luxembourg during the Second World War. It reads: 
On this square, on 10 September 1944 the people of Luxembourg warmly welcomed its liberators, the valiant soldiers of the US 5th Armored Division and their royal highnesses Prince Felix of Luxembourg and Prince John hereditary grand duke of Luxembourg.

Dicks-Lentz monument
At the western end of the Place d'Armes on Square Jan Pallach, there is monument by Pierre Federspiel celebrating Luxembourg's two national poets Dicks (1823–1891) and Michel Lentz (1820–1893), who wrote the words of the national anthem. The lion at the top of the monument represents the Grand Duchy, while the blacksmith symbolizes the steel industry. The inscription on the pillar: Mir wëlle bleiwe wat mir sin (We want to stay what we are) is the motto of the Luxembourgers.

See also
Place Guillaume II

Gallery

References

 

Guillaume II
Tourist attractions in Luxembourg City
Music venues in Luxembourg City